Hampstead Norris railway station was a station on the Didcot, Newbury and Southampton Railway in England. It served the village of Hampstead Norreys in Berkshire (note spelling differentiation). The station closed in 1962.

Facilities
The station was originally built with only a small ticket office and a single platform serving both northbound and southbound trains. However, due to demand the station was eventually expanded to include a passing loop and an additional platform. A small siding and goods shed were used mainly for agricultural goods.

Present day
The station area has been comprehensively redeveloped and almost the only evidence it was ever in the village is a road called "Station Hill". The rail bridge on entering the village from Hermitage still stands with the stump of a loading crane under the bridge preserved. Another large rail bridge just to the north of the village still stands in good condition. The old railway track between Hampstead Norreys and Hermitage was opened as the Eling Way for pedestrians and cyclists in February 2020, part of a larger plan to establish a path between Didcot and Newbury.

Services

References

Disused railway stations in Berkshire
Former Great Western Railway stations
Railway stations in Great Britain opened in 1882
Railway stations in Great Britain closed in 1942
Railway stations in Great Britain opened in 1943
Railway stations in Great Britain closed in 1962